Phaktanglung is a Rural municipality (Gaunpalika) located in Taplejung District in Province No. 1 of eastern Nepal. The local body was formed by merging seven previous VDCs namely Sawadin, Khejenim, Linkhim, Ikhabu, Tapethok, Lelep, Olangchungkhola. Currently, it has a total of 7 wards. It is the 1st largest rural council of Province No. 1.

Geography
The whole rural municipality is a part of protected area which is called Kanchenjunga Conservation Area comprises cultivated lands, forests, pastures, rivers, high altitude lakes and glaciers.

Constituencies
Phaktanglung RM falls under Taplejung 1 (parliamentary constituency) and Taplejung 1(B) (provincial) constituency.

Demography
The total population of Phaktanglung RM is 12,017 in which female comprises 6,137 and male comprises 5,880. There are 2,525 households in the RM.

See also
Taplejung District

References

Rural municipalities in Koshi Province
Rural municipalities in Taplejung District
Rural municipalities of Nepal established in 2017